Ergocornine is a crystalline ergopeptine and one of the ergot alkaloids separated from ergotoxine. It is also a dopamine receptor agonist. It was discovered by Albert Hofmann, the Swiss chemist who created LSD.

References

Ergot alkaloids
Oxazolopyrrolopyrazines
Lactams